Ryan Harrison (born 10 October 1999) is a New Zealand cricketer. He made his List A debut on 29 November 2020, for Auckland in the 2020–21 Ford Trophy. He made his Twenty20 debut on 24 December 2020, for Auckland in the 2020–21 Super Smash. He made his first-class debut on 27 March 2021, for Auckland in the 2020–21 Plunket Shield season.

References

External links
 

1999 births
Living people
New Zealand cricketers
Auckland cricketers
Place of birth missing (living people)